Therese Ninon Abena (born 5 September 1994), known as Ninon Abena, is a Cameroonian footballer who plays as a midfielder for ACF Torino and the Cameroon women's national team.

Domestic career
Abena played for Cameroon top division team Louves Minproff, before signing for Italian Serie C club ACF Torino in November 2019. She signed a one-year contract. She missed a Cameroon qualification game for the 2020 Summer Olympics in order to finalise her club deal.

International career
Abena was part of the Cameroon squad at the 2015 FIFA Women's World Cup. At the time of the squad announcement, she had made 3 appearances. She didn't make an appearance at the tournament. She played in the final of the 2015 African Games, which Cameroon lost to Ghana. She was included in the squad for the 2018 Africa Women Cup of Nations, and scored two goals as Cameroon beat Mali 4–2 in the third-placed playoff. The result meant that Cameroon qualified for the 2019 FIFA Women's World Cup in France. She made two appearances at the 2019 World Cup.

Personal life
Abena is the youngest of 20 siblings. One of her older sisters was unhappy when Abena started playing football.

References

External links 
 FIFA Profile
 

1994 births
Living people
Cameroonian women's footballers
Women's association football midfielders
Cameroon women's international footballers
2015 FIFA Women's World Cup players
2019 FIFA Women's World Cup players
African Games silver medalists for Cameroon
African Games medalists in football
Competitors at the 2015 African Games
Cameroonian expatriate women's footballers
Cameroonian expatriate sportspeople in Italy
Expatriate women's footballers in Italy
21st-century Cameroonian women
20th-century Cameroonian women